The Armed Forces Day Parade in Bremerton, Washington is the longest-running Armed Forces Day parade in the United States.

Established in 1948 to honor John D. Hawk, the Armed Forces Day Parade is part of the Bremerton Armed Forces Day Festival and is held on the third Saturday in May. As of 2018, it had an average annual attendance of between 25,000 and 40,000 spectators and participants. Notable former grand marshals of the parade include Nora W. Tyson.

The 2020 parade was postponed from its traditional date due to the COVID-19 pandemic.

See also
 Naval Base Kitsap
 Veterans Day Parade (New York City)

Notes

References

Parades in the United States
Military parades in the United States
Bremerton, Washington
1948 establishments in Washington (state)